Pseudophaula is a genus of beetles in the family Cerambycidae, containing the following species:

 Pseudophaula foersteri Martins, 1984
 Pseudophaula porosa (Bates, 1881)
 Pseudophaula pustulosa Lane, 1973
 Pseudophaula strigulata Lane, 1973

References

Aerenicini